These are the official results of the Women's Individual Time Trial at the 2000 Summer Olympics in Sydney, Australia. The race was held on Saturday, 30 September 2000 with a race distance of 31.2 km.

Medallists

Final classification

References

Sources
Official Report of the 2000 Sydney Summer Olympics available at  https://web.archive.org/web/20060622162855/http://www.la84foundation.org/5va/reports_frmst.htm

Women's road time trial
Cycling at the Summer Olympics – Women's individual time trial
2000 in women's road cycling
Women's events at the 2000 Summer Olympics